A red envelope (or hóngbāo) is a monetary gift which is given during special occasions in Chinese and other East Asian societies.

Red envelope may also refer to:
WeChat red envelope, a mobile application developed by Chinese technology company Tencent
Red Envelope club, a form of Cabaret in Taiwan 
Red Envelope Entertainment (originally Netflix First) was a film production and distribution arm of Netflix
"Red envelope", a 2003 single by Dynamite Boy
Red envelope by Robert Lopresti, winner of the 2012 Black Orchid Novella Award

See also
Envelope journalism (also red envelope journalism)
Green envelope, a Malay adaptation of the Chinese red envelope custom
Hong Bao (c. 1412–1433), a Chinese eunuch sent on overseas diplomatic missions